Mario Roy (1951 – 5 May 2022) was a Canadian journalist and editorialist. He wrote in the newspaper La Presse from 1981 to 2014.

Biography
Roy was responsible for the Arts et spectacles section of La Presse for several years. In 1991, he published a biography on Gerry Boulet titled Gerry Boulet. Avant de m'en aller, which served as the basis of the 2011 film Gerry directed by Alain DesRochers. He also published a novel in 1997, titled Cité.

Roy became a journalist with La Presse in the 2000s alongside André Pratte and wrote in opposition to the Iraq War while remaining critical of Saddam Hussein. His editorials led to him facing a pie attack.

Roy's politics stood on the centre-right. He was known as an advocate for French-style secularism in Quebec and condemned the use of religious symbols in government, such as the kirpan.

Mario Roy died in Montreal on 5 May 2022, at the age of 71.

Publications
Le Pendu de Chicoutimi (1980)
Gerry Boulet. Avant de m'en aller (1991)
Pour en finir avec l'antiaméricanisme (1993)
Cité (1997)

References

1951 births
2022 deaths
Canadian newspaper journalists
Journalists from Quebec
People from Quebec City
French Quebecers
20th-century Canadian journalists
21st-century Canadian journalists
Canadian male journalists